Bol (lit. Speak or word(s)) is a 2011 Pakistani Urdu language social drama film written, directed and produced by Shoaib Mansoor. The film stars Humaima Malik, Atif Aslam, Mahira Khan, Iman Ali, Shafqat Cheema, Amr Kashmiri, Manzar Sehbai, and Zaib Rehman in the lead roles.  The film marks the debut of singer Atif Aslam and Mahira Khan. It concerns a religious Muslim family facing financial difficulties caused by too many children and changing times, with a major plot involving the father's desire to have a son and his rejection of his existing intersex child. Bol was a critical and commercial success, and became one of the highest-grossing Pakistani films of all time.

This film was part of a maternal and child health project, PAIMAN (Pakistan Initiative for Mothers and Newborns), implemented by and The Johns Hopkins University Center for Communication Programs (JHU.CCP) which entered in a partnership with Shoaib Mansoor's Shoman Productions in 2009. The objective of the project was to advocate for women's rights by bringing the focus of media and the elite of Pakistan to family planning and gender issues. The PAIMAN Project Communications Advisor and country representative of JHU.CCP, Fayyaz Ahmad Khan, served as the executive producer of the movie. The film was reviewed by the Central Board of Film Censors in Lahore on 8 November 2010 and received its approval the next day. Bol is set in Lahore and many students from National College of Arts' (NCA) filmmaking department assisted Shoaib Mansoor on it.

Plot
The film starts by showing the protagonist, Zainab (Humaima Malick), about to be hanged. She tells her story to media right before this happens. She grew up with six sisters, a mother and a father. The father always wanted a son so that the son could help with the financial issues of the family; the father does not believe in women being gainfully employed. They have an intersex child (khawajah sara in Urdu) named Syed Saifullah Khan or Saifi (Amr Kashmiri). The father (Hakim) does not like Saifi since he is intersex. Saifi is deeply loved by the rest of his family. Zainab is married to a guy who keeps harassing her for not giving birth. Hence, she comes back to her father's house. Zainab's mother keeps having deceased babies. Zainab arranges a tubal ligation for her. When Hakim (Manzar Sehbai) finds out, he becomes very angry.

One day, Zainab sees Saifi dressed in women's clothes and gets very disturbed. Hakim owns a small traditional pharmacy and is approached by a man who asks him to teach The Quran to children, since Hakim is a very religious man who has bonds with the mosque. Hakim initially refuses because the man, Saqa (Ishaq), is running a brothel. Meanwhile, the mosque gives him some money to keep, since they believe him to be trustworthy. Mustafa (Atif Aslam), a neighbour, gets Saifi a job at a place where they paint trucks. There, Saifi is harassed because others discriminate against his identification.

One day Saifi is raped. Another intersex, (played by Almas Bobby – who in real life is a transgender person), finds him and takes him home. Hakim overhears Saifi telling his mother and Zainab what happened. Later on, when everybody is asleep, Hakim suffocates Saifi to death with a plastic bag. He must bribe the police officer to keep it a secret with two lakhs. Hakim is forced to take money out of the masjid funds. The masjid asks for the funds, and Hakim does not have enough money. He is forced to go to Saqa's house to get it.

Teaching children the Quran is not giving him enough money, so Saqa gives him another option: Hakim must marry and have a baby with Meena (Iman Ali) who is one of the prostitutes and is Saqa's (Shafqat Cheema) oldest daughter. Hakim keeps having girls, and Saqa tells him that it is the men who decides the sex of the baby. Meanwhile, Zainab gets Ayesha (Mahira Khan) and Mustafa married since Hakim found another man at the masjid and wanted to get Ayesha married to that man. Simultaneously, Hakim marries Meena. When Hakim finds out about Ayesha's marriage, he is furious but cannot do anything about it. Meena has her baby, and it is a girl meaning Saqa gets to keep it. Hakim begs Meena to give him the baby so that the child does not have to face a horrible future. Saqa overhears and kicks Hakim out.

Later on, Meena comes to give Hakim's family the baby. When Hakim's wife asks who that women was, he takes the baby and tells her that he married her. She screams at him, and he beats her up. The mother tells the kids what happened, and Zainab insists they all leave the house and move somewhere else to start a new life.

At night, Saqa comes to take Meena's daughter, since Meena was not supposed to give it to Hakim. Hakim tries to kill the daughter to keep her from a horrible future. He is killed by Zainab with a fatal knock on the head. They hide the baby. Zainab tells Saqa that Hakim killed the baby and threw her out somewhere; she tells him that she killed Hakim, which is why she is being given the death penalty.

Back in the present, a reporter keeps trying to prove that she is innocent but is unable to. Zainab ends by asking that why is only killing a sin? Why is giving birth, without any family planning, not a sin? Then she is hanged. The President (Rashid Khawaja) sees the reporter's newscast that ends with that question and schedules a meeting with the topic as the same as the question. In the end, the rest of the daughters open up a restaurant called Zainab's Cafe, which becomes very successful. They also raise their new half-sister, Meena's daughter.

Cast
Humaima Malik as Zainab 
Atif Aslam as Dr. Mustafa 
Iman Ali as Sabina (Meena), a prostitute, Saqa's daughter and second wife of Hakim Sahib 
Mahira Khan as Ayesha Mustafa 
Shafqat Cheema as Ishaq "Saqa" Kanjar (Panderer) 
Manzar Sehbai as Hakim Sahib
Zaib Rehman as Suraiya
Jafiey as a jasim
Naima Khan as Master's wife
Amr Kashmiri as Saifullah Khan/Saifi, intersex child of Hakim Sahib
Meher Sagar as a young Saifi
Humaira Ali as Marriage Bureau Lady
Irfan Khoosat as Mustafa's father
Rashid Khawaja as the President of Pakistan
Mahnoor Khan as Mahnoor
Gulfam Ramay as GuL G
Almas Bobby as Tara

Release
Bol was released on 24 June 2011 under the banner of Geo Films.  Bol also released in India on 31 August 2011, making it third Pakistani film, after Ramchand Pakistani and Khuda Kay Liye, to release in India. Apart from India, Bol was released in the United States, Canada, United Kingdom, UAE and Australia on 31 August 2011.

Critical reception

Bol received highly positive reviews from critics. Taran Adarsh of Bollywood Hungama gave 4/5 describing it as "A brilliant film embellished with bravura performances." Likewise, Komal Nahta of The Times of India gave the film 4/5 by going on to describe it as "topical and thought-provoking." Saibal Chatterjee of NDTV gave 3 on 5 stating that the "message that the film delivers is urgent, heartfelt and of considerable import."

Galaxy Lollywood, in its review gave 4.4/5 stars to the film and stated it to be "meeting public expectations" after Khuda Kay Liye.

It was awarded the best Hindi film award in IRDS Film awards 2011 by the Institute for Research and Documentation in Social Sciences (IRDS), a Lucknow-based civil society organization for raising many social issues including the regressive attitude of a male-dominated society.

Box office
It established a new box office record in Pakistani cinema. It became the highest earning film in Pakistan in its first week of release, breaking all records. The previous record was held by Bollywood movie My Name Is Khan, which grossed PKR 13.417 million in its first week, whereas Bol did a business of PKR 62.792 million in six days. In two weeks, the total gross revenue of the film from 24 screens amounted to PKR 94,287,090, thus finishing its run with 120 million in its bank. Bol collected  2,80,00000 from 75 screens in India.

It got huge fame and appreciation in India, United States, Canada, United Kingdom, UAE and Australia .

In September 2011, the Times of India reported that Sahara One network has bought seven-year satellite rights of 100 films, including Shoaib Mansoor's Bol for a total of PKR 122 million for all.

Soundtrack

Bol is the soundtrack album of the 2011 Urdu-language Pakistani film Bol by Shoaib Mansoor. Before the movie's release, Atif Aslam (who plays one of the main roles) in an interview stated, "I have done two songs for the soundtrack. It's been a great experience working with Shoaib Mansoor, he is an amazing person and very dedicated. My role isn't controversial and we discussed it beforehand. It's a film that is being made for a good cause."

All songs are mixed and mastered by Kashif Ejaz. The singers include Atif Aslam, Sajjad Ali, Hadiqa Kiani, Ahmed Jahanzeb, Shabnam Majeed, Sahir Ali Bagga, Bina Jawad, Faiza Mujahid and Shuja Haider. The soundtrack was successful and generally received positive reviews from critics. However, one critical review published in The Express Tribune called the movie's soundtrack "A surprising disappointment."

Awards

See also
 List of highest-grossing Pakistani films
 List of Pakistani films of 2011

References

External links
 
 Doing the right thing The News International (newspaper)

2011 films
2010s Urdu-language films
Films scored by Sajjad Ali
Films set in Lahore
Films directed by Shoaib Mansoor
2010s feminist films
Geo Films films
Pakistani drama films
Pakistani LGBT-related films
Lollywood films
2011 drama films
2011 LGBT-related films
Films about intersex